Lyon Mountain may refer to:

Towns 

 Lyon Mountain, New York

Mountains 

 Lyon Mountain (Clinton County, New York) 
 Lyon Mountain (Delaware County, New York)